Five Guns to Tombstone is a 1960 American Western film directed by Edward L. Cahn and starring James Brown, John Wilder, Walter Coy, Robert Karnes and Della Sharman.

Plot
Young outlaw Billy Wade, determined to reform, is roped into a robbery by rich businessman George Landon then framed for it. Landon springs Billy's brother Matt from prison, on the condition he get Billy to go along with the theft. During a struggle for a gun Matt is accidentally killed, and his teenaged son Ted and others mistakenly believe Billy killed him in cold blood. Billy pretends to help bandit Ike Garvey but ultimately assists in his capture, earning Ted's forgiveness.

Cast
 James Brown as Billy Wade
 John Wilder as Ted Wade
 Walter Coy as Ike Garvey
 Robert Karnes as Matt Wade
 Della Sharman as Arlene
 Gregg Palmer as Mel Dixon
 Willis Bouchey as George Landon
 Joe Haworth as Hoke
 Quentin Sondergaard as Hank
 Boyd "Red" Morgan as Hoagie (as Boyd Morgan)
 Jon Locke as Rusty Kolloway
 John Eldredge as Endicott

Production
The film's plotline and lines duplicate those of an earlier Edward Small production, Gun Belt (1953).

See also
 List of American films of 1960

References

External links

1960 films
1960s English-language films
American black-and-white films
American Western (genre) films
1960 Western (genre) films
Films directed by Edward L. Cahn
Films produced by Edward Small
Films scored by Paul Sawtell
1960s American films
Films with screenplays by Richard Schayer
Films about outlaws